Monte Hale (November 17, 1939 - January 2, 1982) was a radio personality and owner of the WMTS-AM and FM radio stations located in Murfreesboro, Tennessee. Hale also served as part-owner of WGNS. From 1960 to 1981, Hale performed radio play-by-play duties for Middle Tennessee State University's football and basketball teams, and became known as "the Voice of the Blue Raiders."

In 1978, he was the play-by-play announcer for the Double-A Nashville Sounds minor league baseball team during their inaugural season in Nashville. Hale also served as play-by-play announcer for Murfreesboro Central High School.

In 1981, he was inducted into MTSU's Kennon Sports Hall of Fame for his contributions as broadcaster for the university's athletic programs.

Doctors discovered a malignant tumor on Hale's tongue in 1966, and removed half of it. Despite that, Hale continued to broadcast as he dealt with cancer for the remainder of his life. Hale died on January 2, 1982.

The school's 11,520-seat basketball arena located in Murphy Center was named after Hale in 1983. The City of Murfreesboro also named a street in his memory.

Notes

References
Freeman, Alan Cole. "WMTS FM 96.3 / WMTS 810 AM." Alan Freeman. 20 November 2005. 12 July 2008.
"Hall of Fame - Monte Hale." MTSU. 12 July 2008.
Valenches, Chuck. "The Sounds of Summer, a Look Back at the 'Voices' of the Sounds." 2007 Nashville Sounds Souvenir Program. April 2007: 14–16.

American radio sports announcers
Middle Tennessee State University
1982 deaths
1939 births
Minor League Baseball broadcasters